General elections were held in Tonga on 1 May 1981. Seven nobles were elected by their peers, whilst a further seven People's Representatives were publicly elected.

Results
Amid a record voter turnout, four of the seven incumbent People's Representatives were unseated. Haʻapai MP ‘Uliti Uata was beaten by Pousima Afeaki; Tongatapu representatives Tomiteau Finau and Papiloa Foliaki were defeated by Joe Tuʻilatai Mataele and Sitili Tupouniua; and Vavaʻu MP Palavilala Tapueluelu was defeated by Ula Afuhaʻamango.

References

Tonga
1981 in Tonga
Elections in Tonga
Non-partisan elections
May 1981 events in Oceania